The Kono people (pronounced koh noh) are a major Mande-speaking ethnic group in Sierra Leone at 5.2% of the country's total population. Their homeland is the diamond-rich Kono District in eastern Sierra Leone. The Kono are primarily diamond miners and farmers.

The Kono people speak the Kono language as their first language and is the most widely spoken language among the Kono people. Many youth from the Kono ethnic group use the Krio language as the primary language of communication with other Sierra Leonean ethnic groups.

Unlike many other Sierra Leonean ethnic groups, the Kono people rarely travel outside Eastern Sierra Leone; as a result only few Konos are found in the capital Freetown and in northern Sierra Leone.

History
The Kono people are the descendants of Mali-Guinean migrants who are said to have moved to Sierra Leone and settled in what is now Kono District in the mid-16th century, however there is archaeological evidence of settlement in Kono District as far back as 2200 B.C. Kono history claims that the Kono were once a powerful people in Mali and Guinea. The Kono migrated to Sierra Leone as peaceful hunters. The tribe was split during partitioning of Africa by European colonists and part of the tribe still exists in neighbouring Guinea.

Attacks from the related Mende people forced the Kono to seek refuge in the Koranko territory to the north, where they were allowed to farm the land. The Mende eventually moved further south, and the Kono returned to their own land in the east.

Economy and culture
The Kono are primarily farmers and in some areas, alluvial diamond miners. They grow rice, cassava, corn, beans, groundnuts, sweet potato, peppers, cassava leaf, greens, potato leaf etc. as their main crops, along with banana, pineapple and plantain, and cash crops such as cocoa, coffee and kola nut. They live in towns and villages and travel daily to their surrounding farm lands to work. They are a polite and hospitable people and even allow strangers to lodge with them or their chiefs.

The size of rural Kono villages varies from several houses to nearly one hundred dwellings. Kono District also contains the city of Koidu / Sefadu and several small towns. Kono houses were at one time round constructions made of mud, clay, and thatch. Although some of these houses still exist today, most are now rectangular and made of adobe blocks or cement with corrugated zinc sheet roofing. The rectangular houses have verandas where the women cook and others can enjoy the shade.

After sunset, in the open compounds (courtyards) of the villages, the entire village may sing. The people dance in a single-file circle to the beat of drums. Each person develops his own individual steps and movements in an attempt to stand out in the crowd.

The Kono year is divided into a rainy season and a dry season. Late dry season (March–April) is the time for preparation and clearing of farms and the rainy season is a time for farming. Families leave their homes early in the morning, walk to their farms, and return home at dusk. Cooking, bathing, and other household chores are done at the farms by most of the women, while the men and other women perform the agricultural tasks.

After the rice harvest, the heavy agricultural work is finished, giving way to the dry season. Most people remain in town every day during the dry season since many social events take place at that time of year. During this period, young boys are initiated into the Poro society, and young girls, into the Bondo or Sande society. These societies teach youth the Kono culture and traditions. Training for these organisations bridges the gap between childhood and adult life.

The dry season is also a time when much courting and many marriages take place. A man's wealth used to be determined by the number of wives he could support. Most men had more than one wife, and those men with many wives were shown the greatest respect and honour. Nowadays many men have only one wife although polygamy is still widely practised. During the dry season, women organise fishing expeditions and older men and women may be found outdoors weaving traditional country cloth.

Religious and spiritual beliefs
Most Konos practice Islam or Christianity. Some practice traditional religion as well. Konos invoke and pray to their ancestors and other spirits for protection, health, guidance and good fortune. They believe the ancestors are present during every activity, including eating, sleeping, and important events. Some Kono are also superstitious and use curses, omens, charms, and magic in their daily lives.

The Kono people also utilize practices of the Bondo secret society which aims at gradually but firmly  establishing attitudes related to adulthood in girls, discussions on fertility, morality and proper sexual comportment. The society also maintains an interest in the well-being of its members throughout their lives.

Notable Kono people
 Foamansa Matturi, Sierra Leonean ruler and military strategist during colonial era
 Samuel Sam-Sumana, former vice-president of Sierra Leone
 Sheku Ahmed Sonsiama Fasuluku III, current Paramount Chief of Sandoh Chiefdom, current Paramount Chief Member of Parliament for Kono
 Tamba kpakiwa, Former opposition leader SLPU WEST VL. and current vice Secretary General SLNA WEST VL. Belgium
 Sahr Randolf Fillie-Faboe, former Sierra Leone's Ambassador to Liberia and  former member of parliament
 Sia Nyama Koroma, Sierra Leone's first lady and wife of President Ernest Bai Koroma
 Samuel Komba Kambo, a retired captain in The Republic of Sierra Leone Armed Forces and one of the leading members of the NPRC junta administration
 Tamba Songu M'briwa, prominent Sierra Leonean politician, formed Dao political Party and former paramount chief of Kono District
 Sahr John Yambasu, former Sierra Leone Ambassador to Russia, former Kono District Council Chairman
 Peter Vandy, former Sierra Leone's Minister of Lands and the Environment
 Alex Tamba Brima, former commander of the Republic of Sierra Leone Armed Rebel Forces and convicted war criminal
 Sahr Senesie, Sierra Leonean football star playing in Germany
 Solomon Yambassu, football star
 Sahr Ermaco Johnny, former Sierra Leone ambassador to China
 Sahr Ermaco Johnny Jnr., son of Ambassador Sahr Ermaco Johnny, China-based technology journalist, Internet entrepreneur and science fiction writer
 Komba Claudius Gbamanja, former member of parliament of Sierra Leone representing Kono District
 Komba Yomba, Sierra Leonean football star
 Komba Eric Koedoyoma, member of Sierra Leone's parliament representing Kono District
 Tamba Kaingbanja, member of parliament of Sierra Leone representing the Kono District
 Abu Mbawa Kongobah, current (deceased) paramount chief of Kono District
 Tamba Fillie Komeh, Economist
 Dr. Tamba S. Foday-Ngongou, former deputy minister of transport & communication
 Hon. Sia E. Foday-Ngongou, former deputy minister of works and maintenance, first kono woman to be appointed minister by Late President Tejan Kabbah
 Dr. Morie Komba Manyeh, former  Minister of Mines and Mineral resources - President Bio's 1st Cabinet
 Prof. Aiah Gbakima, former Minister of Technical & Higher Education - President Bio's 1st Cabinet
Dr. Fuambai Sia Ahmadu, Sierra Leonean-American anthropologist, author, gender activist
 Sahr Hassan Yomba, Chairman Kono District I.T Association, Chairman Kono Distract Master Artesian Association on vocational training and CEO of Hassan Innovation Technology.
Alex Tamba Brima, former rebel leader and convicted war criminal
 Trevoh Chalobah Chelsea FC football star
Hon. Paramount Chief Sahr Fengai Korgbende Kaimachiande |||, former Paramount Chief Member of Parliament for Kono and former Paramount Chief of Gbense Chiefdom 
Sahr Nyaama,
Current Chairman Board of Directors National Youth Service (NYS), Coalition for Change(C4C)Party
Founding Secretary General;Former SLPP National Youth Leader, National Trustee East,and National Organising Secretary.
Dr Khai Adinjay Pormasu Sam, Aviation Management professional and retired United Nations Peacekeeper
 Mustapha Sama
 Emmanuel Samadia

See also
Alatangana - Creator deity in traditional Kono religion.
Present members of Parliament representing the Coalition for change are saa emerson lamina, rebecca kamara nee marquee, paul Sam, Komba Kamanda, sahr kassegbama whose Father s r kassegbama was also a minister and member of parliament, Tom tucker, M L fofanah, sahr Charles sahr bendu and present deputy minister of sportKomba Lawrence Mbayoh, komba sam, present mayor, tamba gbondo, present district council chairman, sahr lebbie kokotoa, consulting pharmacist in the USA, PC paul Gagga SaqueeV, chairman of council of paramount chiefs, fasuluku suku tamba former head of medical council in Sierra Leone and former member of parliament

References

Ethnic groups in Sierra Leone
Mandé people
Female genital mutilation
Female genital mutilation by country